Sugarloaf is in the name of two different mountains that are located in Butte County of northern California.

Butte County mountains
Located in the eastern Sacramento Valley, above the northern shore of the Thermalito Forebay (Feather River project), and northwest of Oroville.

See also

Sugarloaf (mountain)

References

Mountains of Butte County, California
Hills of California
Geography of the Sacramento Valley 
Mountains of the Sierra Nevada (United States)
Mountains of Northern California